Hetschkomyia maculipennis is a species of tephritid or fruit flies in the genus Hetschkomyia of the family Tephritidae.

Distribution
Peru.

References

Tephritinae
Insects described in 1914
Diptera of South America